The Board of Intermediate and Secondary Education, Faisalabad (colloquially known as BISE Faisalabad) is an examining board for intermediate (higher secondary) and secondary (high school) education in Faisalabad Division.

Introduction 
BISE Faisalabad was established in 1988. The current jurisdiction of the board was first under the supervision of Board of Intermediate and Secondary Education, Sargodha.
Its main building is now on the main jhang road near the Faisalabad International Airport.

Jurisdiction 
The jurisdiction of Faisalabad Board includes Faisalabad Division which includes the following districts:
 Faisalabad
 Chiniot
 Toba Tek Singh
 Jhang

BISE Faisalabad exams and results 
Board of Intermediate and Secondary Education (BISE), Faisalabad conducts Matric (9th and 10th) class exams and Intermediate (HSSC part I and part II) exams every year. A great number of students participate in these exams every year. The exams mostly start in the month of March and end in April, while the results of BISE Faisalabad are announced in the month of July and August. The matric result is usually announced in July, while the inter result is announced by the end of August or the start of September. Results of all the classes are also published on the BISE website. On the days when the results of 10th and 12th class are announced, there is a ceremony at the Board office where medals and other awards are given to the position holder students.

See also 
 List of educational boards in Pakistan
 Board of Intermediate Education, Karachi
 Board of Secondary Education, Karachi
 Board of Intermediate and Secondary Education, Lahore
 Board of Intermediate and Secondary Education, Hyderabad
 Board of Intermediate and Secondary Education, Rawalpindi
 Board of Intermediate and Secondary Education, Multan
 Board of Intermediate and Secondary Education, Gujranwala
 Board of Intermediate and Secondary Education, Sargodha

External links
 BISE Faisalabad official website
 BISE Faisalabad Board 10th Class Date Sheet 2023 (unofficial)
 9th Class Date Sheet Bise Faisalabad 2023 (unofficial)

Faisalabad